Attack of the Mutants! is a 1981 board game published by Yaquinto Publications.

Gameplay
Attack of the Mutants! is a game where the players are in the science building at Central State Tech, desperately trying to warp to an alternate Earth as the mutants try to stop them.

Reception
David Ladyman reviewed Attack of the Mutants! in The Space Gamer No. 41. Ladyman commented that "The graphics are distinct and colorful, although it can be annoying that the counters are too large for some of the rooms. The game is probably worth [the price], especially if creature-features are your kind of show."

Lewis Pulsipher reviewed Attack of the Mutants in The Space Gamer No. 43. Pulsipher commented that "Considering how little skill is involved, the presentation seems unnecessarily complicated. For completists only."

Reviews
Asimov's Science Fiction v7 n3 (1983 03)
Jeux & Stratégie #14

References

Board games introduced in 1981
Yaquinto Publications games